Bechencha (Betinçe) is a rural locality (a selo), the only inhabited locality, and the administrative center of Bechenchinsky Rural Okrug of Lensky District in the Sakha Republic, Russia, located  from Lensk, the administrative center of the district. Its population as of the 2010 Census was 786, up from 777 recorded during the 2002 Census.

References

Notes

Sources
Official website of the Sakha Republic. Registry of the Administrative-Territorial Divisions of the Sakha Republic. Lensky District. 

Rural localities in Lensky District, Sakha Republic